Owlknight is a 1999 novel by Mercedes Lackey and is the third book in the Darian's Tale trilogy.

Plot summary
Two years after Owlsight k'Valdemar Vale and Ghost Cat village are both flourishing, as is the new Healer Sanctuary where Northern tribes can come to get healing for the plague that resulted from the Mage Storms. Keisha, who has made full Healer, has been pairing with Darian who is about ready to try for Master mage status.

The village of Errold's Grove has become part of a Joint Council governing the area along with Lord Breon and Ghost Cat tribe. Considering the changes and influx of peoples to the northwestern border the Queen in Haven has decided to create a new permanent Herald posting in the county and Herald-Mage Anda (part of the first batch of Herald-Mages trained in Winds of Fury) will be taking up residence along with his protégé, newly promoted Herald Shandi. In order to ensure Darian and k'Valdemar Vale are given sufficient status to treat evenly with Anda, Lord Breon and Chief Vordon of Ghost Cat plan a series of honors and events for him to coincide with the Heralds' arrival.

Soon after Darian attains Master rank and the ceremonies are concluded, he finally takes the time for himself to try to find out what happened when his parents disappeared 7 years ago. He finds traces in the Pelagiris Forest and finds clues among trade-goods brought to Sanctuary by Northern tribes in payment for services. He organizes a party to travel North to find Raven tribe that includes Keisha, Shandi, Kelvren, Steelmind k'Vala and Hywel.

Not knowing if there are more aggressive tribes in the North like Blood Bear, the party travels carefully and in the guise of traders. They end up having to evade Wolverine tribe and its Eclipse Shaman who have taken up where Blood Bear left off and travel up past the pass created by Leareth in Magic's Price to find Raven. Darian's parents, Daralie and Kullen Firkin, are found alive, prospering, and with more children as members of Raven tribe.

In the meantime, the Wolverine Shaman has tracked them down and Darian must fight his first mage duel. The remaining members of Blood Bear tribe accompany the warriors of Wolverine and attack Raven as the Shaman and Darian fight. This spells the end of Blood Bear as a tribe and Darian must say goodbye to his parents who choose to remain with Raven. Keisha and Darian must now try to make a path to the future for themselves.

Publication history 
 Owlknight, Mercedes Lackey, copyright 1999, Daw Books, 

Valdemar Universe
American fantasy novels
1999 American novels